Intercar is the second largest interurban bus carrier within the province of Quebec, Canada, and one of the largest providers of school buses. The company was founded in 1959 in Jonquière, but expanded greatly in 1990 with the acquisition of Voyageur's routes in the Saguenay–Lac-Saint-Jean region and the North Coast of the Saint Lawrence River. The next step in the evolution of the Intercar Group, already well established in student transportation in Saguenay-Lac-Saint-Jean, was the launch of school bus services in the area around Quebec City. Further expansion of their interurban routes to Sept-Îles meant that by 2001 they dominated those services in the triangle between Sept-Iles, Dolbeau and Quebec. Throughout the early part of this century they have continued to acquire more school transportation companies and further grow their charter service.

Divisions
The group website provides a helpful list of waypoints and bus stop locations. Operations are based around three centres in Jonquière, Chicoutimi and Quebec City. Subsidiaries which operate from these locations are:
 Jonquiere
 Autobus Jasmin 
 Intercar Saguenay
 Autobus Gilbert
 Autobus JDJ 
 Intercar du Fjord 
 Intercar Chibougamau
 Québec
 Intercar Inc.
 Intercar Atlantique
 Autocar Fournier 
 Transport adapté Intercar
 Transport scolaire Intercar
 Chicoutimi
 Autobus Laterrière
 Intercar La Baie 
 Paul Tremblay Transport 
 Autobus Tremblay & Tremblay 
 Intercar Inc. 
 Transports spécialisés du Saguenay

Expedibus

Expedibus is a package shipping and courier company, operated cooperatively throughout Quebec by Orléans Express, Intercar, Autobus Maheux and Limocar.

Fleet
 GMC PD 4107
 GMC PD 4905
 MCI MC-8
 MCI MC-9
 MCI 102A3
 MCI J4500
 Prevost Prestige
 Prevost LeMirage
 Prevost H5-60
 Prevost LeMirage XL
 Prevost LeMirage XL-45
 Prevost H3-40
 Prevost H3-41
 Prevost H3-45
 Prevost LeMirage XLII
 Girardin Minibus
 School buses manufactured by Blue Bird and Thomas.

References

External links
 
 EXPEDIBUS
 Pictures from barraclou.com

Bus transport in Quebec
Intercity bus companies of Canada
Companies based in Quebec
Transport in Saguenay, Quebec